Jennifer Miley Falk (born 26 April 1993) is a Swedish footballer who plays as a goalkeeper for the Swedish national team and BK Häcken.

Private life 
Falk lives together with Swedish footballer Pernilla Johansson in a same-sex relationship.

References

External links 
 
 

1993 births
Living people
Swedish women's footballers
Torslanda IK players
Jitex BK players
Mallbackens IF players
BK Häcken FF players
Damallsvenskan players
Women's association football goalkeepers
2019 FIFA Women's World Cup players
Footballers at the 2020 Summer Olympics
Olympic footballers of Sweden
Olympic medalists in football
Medalists at the 2020 Summer Olympics
Olympic silver medalists for Sweden
Sweden women's international footballers
UEFA Women's Euro 2022 players
Swedish LGBT sportspeople
LGBT association football players
Lesbian sportswomen
21st-century LGBT people